Cloverly is an unincorporated town and census-designated place in Montgomery County, Maryland,  United States. Its population was 15,285 as of the 2020 census.

Geography
As an unincorporated area, Cloverly's boundaries are not officially defined. Cloverly is, however, recognized by the United States Census Bureau as a census-designated place, and by the United States Geological Survey as a populated place located at  (39.102958, −76.976275).

The commercial center of Cloverly lies at the intersection of New Hampshire Avenue (MD Route 650) and Briggs Chaney Road.

Demographics

2010

2000
At the 2000 census there were 7,835 people in 2,492 households, including 2,113 families, in the CDP. The racial makeup of the area was 61.52% White, 19.13% African American, 0.40% Native American, 14.05% Asian, 1.98% from other races, and 2.92% from two or more races. Hispanic or Latino of any race were 5.13%.

Of the 2,492 households 43.7% had children under the age of 18 living with them, 71.4% were married couples living together, 9.8% had a female householder with no husband present, and 15.2% were non-families. 12.0% of households were one person and 3.6% were one person aged 65 or older. The average household size was 3.14 and the average family size was 3.41.

The age distribution was 29.0% under the age of 18, 7.4% from 18 to 24, 25.5% from 25 to 44, 29.2% from 45 to 64, and 8.9% 65 or older. The median age was 39 years. For every 100 females, there were 98.0 males. For every 100 females age 18 and over, there were 93.3 males.

The median household income was $82,544 and the median family income  was $88,370. Males had a median income of $51,377 versus $40,972 for females. The per capita income for the area was $31,123. About 2.5% of families and 3.4% of the population were below the poverty line, including 3.6% of those under age 18 and none of those age 65 or over.

Education
Montgomery County Public Schools operates public schools.

 Public schools for the area include Cloverly Elementary (which lies in the town), Briggs Chaney Middle, and the three high schools of the Northeast Consortium: James Hubert Blake High School, Paint Branch High School, and Springbrook High School.
Only Blake is within the Cloverly CDP.

References

 
Census-designated places in Maryland
Census-designated places in Montgomery County, Maryland